This is a list of Croatian television related events from 1996.

Events
3 March - Maja Blagdan is selected to represent Croatia at the 1996 Eurovision Song Contest with her song "Sveta ljubav". She is selected to be the fourth Croatian Eurovision entry during Dora held at the Crystal Ballroom of Hotel Kvarner in Opatija.

Debuts

International
 Friends (Unknown)

Television shows

Ending this year

Births

Deaths
 August 15 – Sven Lasta, actor

References